Caryocorbula is a genus of saltwater clams belonging to the Corbulidae family, classified as marine bivalve molluscs.: This genus is often referred to as corbula and serracorbula instead of caryocorbula.

Species 
Species in this genus, as listed by the World Registry of Marine Species, include

 Caryocorbula amethystina Olsson, 1961
 Caryocorbula biradiata G. B. Sowerby I, 1833
 Caryocorbula chittyana C. B. Adams, 1852
 Caryocorbula colimensis Coan, 2002
 Caryocorbula contracta Say, 1822
 Caryocorbula ira Dall, 1908
 Caryocorbula lavalleana d'Orbigny, 1853
 Caryocorbula luteola Carpenter, 1864
 Caryocorbula marmorata Hinds, 1843
 Caryocorbula nasuta G. B. Sowerby I, 1833
 Caryocorbula otra Coan, 2002
 Caryocorbula ovulata G. B. Sowerby I, 1833
 Caryocorbula porcella Dall, 1916
 Caryocorbula swiftiana C. B. Adams, 1852
 Caryocorbula caribaea d'Orbigny, 1853
 Caryocorbula cymella Dall, 1881
 Caryocorbula dietziana C. B. Adams, 1852

References 

Corbulidae
Bivalve genera